Richard A. Leo (born November 2, 1963) is the Hamill Family Professor of Law and Psychology at the University of San Francisco School of Law, and a Fellow in the Institute for Legal Research at the University of California, Berkeley School of Law. He previously taught at the University of Colorado, Boulder from 1994 to 1997, and at the University of California, Irvine from 1997 to 2006. He is known for his research on police interrogation practices, false confessions, and wrongful convictions. He was elected as a Guggenheim fellow in 2011 and was a fellow of the Center for the Advanced Study in the Behavioral Sciences from 2014 to 2015.

References

External links
Faculty page

Living people
1963 births
University of San Francisco faculty
American legal scholars
University of California, Berkeley alumni
University of Colorado Boulder faculty
University of California, Irvine faculty
Center for Advanced Study in the Behavioral Sciences fellows